EDHEC Business School is a French grandes écoles business school with campus locations in: Lille, France; Nice, France; Paris, France; London, UK; and Singapore.

EDHEC holds the coveted triple accreditation of EQUIS, AACSB and AMBA. According to the Financial Times, the prestigious business school consistently ranks among the top 10 European business schools and is placed third in France, after HEC Paris and ESCP.

EDHEC offers its flagship Master in Management, MSc International Finance, MBA and EMBA programs, specialized MSc programs, PhD program and executive education.

In 2019, EDHEC had 8,600 students enrolled in traditional graduate and undergraduate programmes, 245 exchange and double-degree agreements with many academic institutions and a network of more than 40,000 alumni in over 125 countries.

History 
EDHEC Business School was founded in 1906 by entrepreneurs from the North of France. Motte Duthoit, leading textile manufacturer and mayor of Roubaix, France, purchased the land known as “La campagne” on which EDHEC headquarters currently stand. Marcel Tiberghien, a prosperous wool industrialist from Tourcoing, and his wife Madeleine (née Vanoutryve), from a textile family from Roubaix, decided to move out of the town and house their large family in the fresh air of the countryside. The couple purchased a total of 7 hectares in Marcq-en-Baroeul and commissioned one of the greatest architects and landscapers of the time, Jacques Gréber, to design the Anglo-Norman style manor and the English gardens surrounded by century-old beech trees with a pond in the south part of the manor and a rose garden in the west part.  He also built in the north part a gardener's house and a stable for three horses. Gréber is known for major projects such as the Fairmont Parkway in Philadelphia, urban plans for Montreal and Marseilles, etc.

The Manor now serves as a training centre for EDHEC Executive Education. "EDHEC" is originally an acronym for the French "École des Hautes Etudes Commerciales du Nord" or “School of Higher Education in Business Administration from the North”.
 1906 Creation of a department for business studies at the “Ecole des Hautes Etudes Industrielles” in Lille
 1921 Founding of the school under its current name « Ecole des Hautes Etudes Commerciales du Nord »
 1947 Establishment of Graduate Association, EDHEC Alumni
 1958 Choice of operational framework. Registration as an independent association with “Grande Ecole” status and ability to confer master-lever qualifications.
 1971 Official recognition of the School by the French Department of Higher Education and Research.
 1983 First international agreement with London School of Economics.
 1988 Launch of the ESPEME School (EDHEC BBA nowadays), delivering a 4-year bachelor programme.

 1991 Setting up the campus in Nice.
 1999 EQUIS Accreditation. First international basepoint (London)
 2000 Introduction of the Executive programme portfolio.
 2001 Launch of EDHEC Risk Institute (ERI)
 2003 AMBA Accreditation.
 2004 AACSB Accreditation.
 2010 Launch of the EDHEC Incubator (EYE)
 2011 Opening of the Executive campuses (Singapore and Paris)
 2012 Launch of ERI Scientific Beta. Strategic partnerships with Yale and Princeton.
 2013 Launch of EDHEC Family Business Centre (EFBC)
 2014 ESPEME becomes EDHEC BBA
 2016 Launch of EDHEC Infra

Grande école degrees 

EDHEC Business School is a grande école, a French institution of higher education that is separate from, but parallel and often connected to, the main framework of the French public university system. Grandes écoles, like EDHEC, are elite academic institutions that admit students through an extremely competitive process, and a significant proportion of their graduates occupy the highest levels of French society. Similar to Ivy League schools in the United States, Oxbridge in the UK, and C9 League in China, graduation from a grande école is considered the prerequisite credential for any top government, administrative and corporate position in France.

The degrees are accredited by the Conférence des Grandes Écoles and awarded by the Ministry of National Education (France). Higher education business degrees in France are organized into three levels thus facilitating international mobility: the Licence / Bachelor's degrees, and the Master's and Doctorat degrees. The Bachelors and the Masters are organized in semesters: 6 for the Bachelors and 4 for the Masters. Those levels of study include various "parcours" or paths based on UE (Unités d'enseignement or Modules), each worth a defined number of European credits (ECTS). A student accumulates those credits, which are generally transferable between paths. A Bachelors is awarded once 180 ECTS have been obtained (bac + 3); a Masters is awarded once 120 additional credits have been obtained (bac +5). The highly coveted PGE (Grand Ecole Program) ends with the degree of Master's in Management (MiM)

Rankings
In 2022, EDHEC Business School was ranked among the top-10 European Business Schools. EDHEC's Master in Marketing is consistently ranked among the top 10 in the world, and its Master in Finance is regularly placed within the top 5 worldwide. Furthermore, the Financial Times ranked EDHEC #1 worldwide for their Master in Finance in 2017. The Economist ranks the university 3rd in the world for its Master's in Management. More rankings can be found below.

Degree programmes
EDHEC offers a Bachelor, Master in Management, Master of Science, Doctorate degrees in a variety of disciplines including finance, entrepreneurship, marketing, law and management. The school also has two Masters in Business Administration programmes: the EDHEC Global MBA (full-time MBA) and the EDHEC Executive MBA.

All courses are taught in English and in a mixture of French and English.

International BBA 
The Bachelor in Business Administration is the undergraduate degree of EDHEC Business School. The 4-year programme alternates work placements and academic exchanges worldwide. Three tracks are offered: Global Business Track, Business Management Track and the On-line track, plus an apprenticeship section.

Master in Management (MiM) 
The MiM is the historic “Grande Ecole” programme of EDHEC Business School. The 2-year course provides with different areas of specialization: Financial Economics, Business Management or Global Economic Transformation & Technology. Taught entirely in English, all the MiM tracks (except the Global Economic Transformation & Technology track) award a Double Degree: Master in Management and Master of Science.

Masters of Science (MSc) 

EDHEC offers 13 MSc programmes for studies in Accounting & Finance, Corporate Finance & Banking, Financial Engineering, International Finance, Climate Change & Sustainable Finance, Law and Tax Management, Creative Business & Social Innovation, Data Analytics & Digital Business, Entrepreneurship & Innovation, Global business and Sustainability, Management Studies, Marketing management and strategy, Consultancy and Digital transformation.

Global MBA 
The Global Master of Business Administration of EDHEC Business School has an international student body from 37 countries with an average of 7 years’ work experience (as of 2017 promotion). The 10-month programme, full in English, allows students to craft a customized experience, choosing from 4 different key areas: Entrepreneurship, Digital Innovation, International Finance and Global Leadership. Headquartered in the French Riviera, this degree programme proposes business trips enabling students to develop a global mindset and visit businesses in South Africa, London, Paris, Singapore or Silicon Valley.

Executive MBA 
This part-time programme is aimed to meet the educational needs of managers and executives, allowing participants to earn an MBA in 16 months while working. Participants come from all type and size of organizations – profit, nonprofit, government – representing a variety of industries. EDHEC EMBA participants typically hold a higher level of work experience (8 years or more), compared to full-time MBA students. With a student body that is 22% international and 34% female (as of 2017 promotion), this degree programme proposes two intakes (February or September) and two formats: weekend format (Friday and Saturday, twice a month) or weekday format (Wednesday to Saturday, once a month).

PhD in Finance 
The EDHEC PhD in Finance is the highest degree conferred by the Business School. Its structure includes core courses, electives, research workshops and a final dissertation.

Partnerships and alliances 

EDHEC has 230 international partners offering 22 double degrees. It has strategic academic alliances with the London School of Economics and Political Science, UCLA, UC Berkeley and MIT Sloan School of Management.

Research

EDHEC Business School is involved in academic research.

EDHEC counts with six research centres in financial analysis and accounting, economics, risk and asset management, law, family.  The common goal of research centres is to meet international academic standards while also making the results useful to business and to policymakers. EDHEC conducts applied research in the following fields:
 Finance: Created in 2001, EDHEC-Risk Institute conducts research in asset management, most particularly in the organisation and improvement of risk management for industry players.
 Accounting and financial analysis: Created in 2006, the EDHEC Financial Analysis and Accounting Research Centre works on the choice of discount rate in company valuation and in particular on the integration of systemic accounting risk.
 Economics: Since February 2006, EDHEC has had an economics research team focused on public policy and state reform. This team works on four broad themes: financing and reform of the welfare state, labor policies and competition, evaluation of sovereign risk and optimal management of the public debt and European budgetary governance.
 Legal: The Legal EDHEC Research Centre has Legal Performance and Company Competitiveness as a subtitle. At the heart of the centre is the notion of legal performance and its variations.

References

External links

Grandes écoles
Business schools in France
Educational institutions established in 1906
1906 establishments in France
Lille